Tor Hermod Refsum (1894 – 1981) was a Norwegian painter.

He was born in Kristiania, and studied under Othon Friesz, André Lhote and Georg Jacobsen. He is represented with two landscapes in the National Gallery of Norway, which also owns some gouaches and aquarels. He was especially preoccupied with the landscape of the Gudbrandsdal valley.

References

1894 births
1981 deaths
20th-century Norwegian painters
Norwegian male painters
Artists from Oslo
Norwegian expatriates in France
20th-century Norwegian male artists